Consort Shu may refer to:

Consort Shu (Qianlong) (1728–1777), concubine of the Qianlong Emperor
Consort Shu (Jiaqiang) (died 1792), concubine of the Jiaqing Emperor
Wenxiu (1909–1953), consort of Puyi